Javier Orozco Gómez (born 18 November 1964) is a Mexican politician affiliated with the PVEM. As of 2013 he served as Deputy of both the LIX and LXII Legislatures of the Mexican Congress representing the State of Mexico. He also served as Senator during the LX and LXI Legislatures. He was one of the promoters of the infamous Televisa Law.

References

1964 births
Living people
Politicians from Mexico City
Members of the Senate of the Republic (Mexico)
Members of the Chamber of Deputies (Mexico)
Ecologist Green Party of Mexico politicians
21st-century Mexican politicians
National Autonomous University of Mexico alumni